Requiem for a Nun is a play by Albert Camus, adapted from William Faulkner's 1951 novel of the same name. The play was published in 1962. Camus had a great admiration for Faulkner. In his play, he changed the dialogues substantially. According to John Philip Couch "In Requiem pour une nonne Camus achieved an unusual density and tension appropriate to tragedy... One may conclude that for the first time in his career Camus was capable of writing a serious play worthy of his accomplishments in the novel."

See also
 Temple Drake
•  James Baldwin, No Name in the Street

References

External links
 

1962 plays
Plays by Albert Camus
Adaptations of works by William Faulkner